Saints Dominic and Francis Saving the World from Christ's Anger is an oil on canvas painting by Peter Paul Rubens, executed in 1620, now in the Museum of Fine Arts of Lyon. It is linked to his similar work The Virgin Mary and Saint Francis Saving the World from Christ's Anger (Brussels).

Sources

1620 paintings
Paintings depicting Jesus
Paintings of Francis of Assisi
Paintings in the collection of the Museum of Fine Arts of Lyon
Paintings by Peter Paul Rubens
Maps in art
Snakes in art